Marijonas is a Lithuanian masculine given name. Individuals with the name Marijonas include:
Marijonas Mikutavičius (born 1971), television presenter, singer, songwriter, and journalist 
Marijonas Petravičius (born 1979), basketball player

References

Lithuanian masculine given names